The 2004 Ordina Open was a tennis tournament played on grass courts in Rosmalen, 's-Hertogenbosch in the Netherlands that was part of the International Series of the 2004 ATP Tour and of Tier III of the 2004 WTA Tour. The tournament was held from 14 June until 20 June 2004. Michaël Llodra and Mary Pierce won the singles titles.

Finals

Men's singles

 Michaël Llodra defeated  Guillermo Coria 6–3, 6–4

Women's singles

 Mary Pierce defeated  Klára Koukalová 7–6(8–6), 6–2

Men's doubles

 Martin Damm /  Cyril Suk defeated  Lars Burgsmüller /  Jan Vacek 6–3, 6–7(7–9), 6–3

Women's doubles

 Lisa McShea /  Milagros Sequera defeated  Jelena Kostanić /  Claudine Schaul 7–6(7–3), 6–3

External links
 
 ATP tournament profile
 WTA tournament profile

Ordina Open
Ordina Open
Rosmalen Grass Court Championships
2004 in Dutch tennis